Carlos Aurelio Rubira Infante (16 September 1921 – 14 September 2018) was an Ecuadorian singer and songwriter of pasillo and pasacalle music.

He began performing his songs on the radio station El Telégrafo for a program called "La hora agrícola". He then formed the group "Vera Santos-Rubira".

Career
He also formed the group "Los Porteños" with the singer Olimpo Cardenas. Until then Cardenas had been a tango singer but asked Rubira to teach him to sing pasillo music. He also influenced the singers Fresia Saavedra, Pepe and Julio Jaramillo, among others. As teenagers, he and Julio Jaramillo once worked together at a shoe store, and after work he would invite Jaramillo over to teach him some songs. His friends Olimpo Cardenas and Julio Jaramillo went on to international fame singing the type of music Rubira taught them.

Awards
Rubira was awarded the National Prize in Art "Premio Eugenio Espejo" in 2008 from the President of Ecuador. Two months before his death, he was announced as one of the recipients to be inducted into the Latin Songwriters Hall of Fame.

Discography

Carlos Rubira Infante wrote over 400 songs. Among them are:

 Guayaquileño madera de guerrero
 Guayaquil pórtico de oro
 Ambato tierra de flores
 Esposa
 En las lejanías
 Lindo Milagro
 Lo mejor de mi tierra
 El Cóndor Mensajero (himno del migrate Alauseño a lo largo y ancho del mundo)
 Playita mía
 Mi primer amor
 Quiero verte madre
 Quedas tranquila
 Para entonces
 Historia de amor
 Al oído
 Cálmate corazón
 Desde que te fuiste
 En las lejanías\
 Por qué (pasillos)
 El cartero
 Chica linda
 Venga conozca El Oro (pasacalle)
 El bautizo (albazo)
 Pedazo de bandido (aire típico)

References 

People from Guayaquil
20th-century Ecuadorian male singers
1921 births
2018 deaths